Prodiamesa olivacea is a species of fly in the family Chironomidae. It is found in the  Palearctic.

References

Chironomidae
Insects described in 1818
Nematoceran flies of Europe